The Livonian Order was an autonomous branch of the Teutonic Order,
formed in 1237. From 1435 to 1561 it was a member of the Livonian Confederation.

History
The order was formed from the remnants of the Livonian Brothers of the Sword after their defeat by Samogitians in 1236 at the Battle of Schaulen (Saule). They were incorporated into the Teutonic Knights and became known as the Livonian Order in 1237.  In the summer of that year, the Master of Prussia Hermann Balk rode into Riga to install his men as castle commanders and administrators of Livonia.

In 1238, the Teutonic Knights of Livonia signed the Treaty of Stensby with the Kingdom of Denmark. Under this agreement, Denmark would support the expansion ambitions of the order in exchange for northern maritime Estonia.

In 1242, the Livonian Order tried to take the city of Novgorod. However, they were defeated by Alexander Nevsky in the Battle on the Ice.

Fortresses as Paide in land ceded by Denmark in the Treaty of Stensby allowed the order to contain the threat of Russian troops. For that reason, the order focused on its southern borders and Semigallia.

Semigallia was a strategic territory for the Livonian Order. Lithuanians passed through Semigallia to raid settlements in Livonia, and they took advantage of the winter ice pack in the Gulf of Riga to reach Oesel Island. Also, this territory kept the Livonian Branch of the Teutonic Order separated from the Prussian Branch.

Between 1237 and 1290, the Livonian Order conquered all of Courland, Livonia, and Semigallia. In 1298, Lithuanians took Karkus Castle north of Riga, and defeated the order in the Battle of Turaida, killing Livonian Land Master Bruno and 22 knights. In 1346, the order bought the Duchy of Estonia from King Valdemar IV of Denmark. Life within the order's territory is described in the Chronicle of Balthasar Russow (Chronica der Provinz Lyfflandt).

The Teutonic Order fell into decline following its defeat in the Battle of Grunwald in 1410 and the secularization of its Prussian territories by Albert of Brandenburg in 1525, while the Livonian Order managed to maintain an independent existence.

The Livonian Order's defeat in the Battle of Święta (Wiłkomierz) on September 1, 1435, which claimed the lives of the master and several high-ranking knights, brought the order closer to its neighbors in Livonia. The Livonian Confederation agreement (eiine fruntliche eyntracht) was signed in Walk on December 4, 1435, by the Archbishop of Riga, the bishops of Courland, Dorpat, Ösel-Wiek and Reval; the representatives of the Livonian Order and vassals, and the deputies of Riga, Reval and Dorpat city municipal councils.

During the Livonian War, however, the order suffered a decisive defeat by troops of Muscovite Russia in the Battle of Ergeme in 1560. The Livonian Order then sought protection from Sigismund II Augustus,  King of Poland and Grand Duke of Lithuania, who had intervened in a war between Bishop William of Riga and the Brothers in 1557.

After coming to an agreement with Sigismund II, Augustus and his representatives (especially Mikołaj "the Black" Radziwiłł), the last Livonian Master, Gotthard Kettler, secularized the order and converted to Lutheranism. In the southern part of the Brothers' lands he created the Duchy of Courland and Semigallia for his family. Most of the remaining lands were seized by the Grand Duchy of Lithuania. The north of Estonia was taken back by Denmark and Sweden.

From the 14th to the 16th centuries, Middle Low German as spoken in the towns of the Hanseatic League was the established language, but was subsequently succeeded by High German as official language in the course of the 16th and 17th centuries.

Masters of the Livonian Order
The Livonian Master, like the grandmaster of the Teutonic Order, was elected by his fellow knights for a life term. The grandmaster exercised supervisory powers and his advice was considered equal to a command. The grandmaster of Teutonic knights did not limit local autonomy, he rarely visited Livonia or sent ambassadors for oversight.

Hermann Balk 1237–1238
Dietrich von Grüningen 1238–1242
Dietrich von Grüningen 1244–1246 
Andreas von Stierland 1248–1253
Anno von Sangershausen 1253–1256
Burchard von Hornhausen 1256–1260
Werner von Breithausen 1261–1263
Konrad von Mandern 1263–1266
Otto von Lutterberg 1266–1270
Walther von Nortecken 1270–1273
Ernst von Rassburg 1273–1279 
Konrad von Feuchtwangen 1279–1281
Wilken von Endorp 1281–1287
Konrad von Herzogenstein 1288–1290
Halt von Hohembach –1293
Heinrich von Dinkelaghe 1295–1296
Bruno 1296–1298
Gottfried von Rogga 1298–1307
Gerhard van Joeck 1309–1322
Johannes Ungenade 1322–1324
Reimar Hane 1324–1328
Everhard von Monheim 1328–1340
Burchard von Dreileben 1340–1345
Goswin von Hercke 1345–1359
Arnold von Vietinghof 1359–1364
Wilhelm von Vrymersheim 1364–1385
Robin von Eltz 1385–1389
Wennemar Hasenkamp von Brüggeneye 1389–1401
Konrad von Vietinghof 1401–1413
Diderick Tork 1413–1415
Siegfried Lander von Spanheim 1415–1424
Zisse von Rutenberg 1424–1433
Franco Kerskorff 1433–1435
Heinrich von Bockenvorde 1435–1437
Heinrich Vinke von Overbergen 1438–1450
Johann Osthoff von Mengede 1450–1469
Johann Wolthuss von Herse 1470–1471
Bernd von der Borch 1471–1483
Johann Freytag von Loringhoven 1483–1494
Wolter von Plettenberg 1494–1535
Hermann Hasenkamp von Brüggeneye 1535–1549
Johann von der Recke 1549–1551
Heinrich von Galen 1551–1557
Johann Wilhelm von Fürstenberg 1557–1559
Godert (Gotthard) Kettler 1559–1561

Commanderies of the Livonian Order
Across modern territory of Estonia and Latvia

Estonia
Komturei Reval
Komturei Pernau
Komturei Jerwen
Komturei Fellin
Komturei Talkhof

Latvia
Komturei Marienburg
Landmarschall Segewold
Ordensmeister (Komturei) Dünamünde
Komturei Ascheraden
Komturei Dünaburg
Komturei Bauske
Komturei Mitau
Komturei Doblen
Komturei Goldingen
Komturei Windau

References

 
Livonian Confederation
Livonian Crusade
State of the Teutonic Order
Northern Crusades
1237 establishments in Europe
Establishments in the State of the Teutonic Order
13th-century establishments in Europe
1561 disestablishments in Europe
1560s disestablishments in the Holy Roman Empire